BetVictor is an online gambling company headquartered in Gibraltar. Founded in 1946, it offers products such as sports betting and online casino. The company is currently owned by Michael Tabor.

History 
The company was founded by William Chandler who owned Walthamstow Stadium, a greyhound racing track in the London Borough of Waltham Forest in East London, which he opened in 1931. After the death of William Chandler in 1946, the bookmaking business passed to Victor Sr. and Jack. Victor Sr. died suddenly in 1974 and the business passed to Victor Jr., who at the time was working in the hotel industry in Spain.

In 1998, the headquarters was moved to Gibraltar to avoid UK gambling tax. It has been argued this was a cause for Gordon Brown abolishing gambling tax in his 2001 budget.

In 2004, the company was rebranded "VC Bet". Then in late 2008, Chandler chose to revert the name to "Victor Chandler". In 2012, the company rebranded itself again as BetVictor to ensure consistency and recognition across all international markets. In May 2014, businessman and major shareholder of Victor Chandler International, Michael Tabor took over the company.

In September 2021, BetVictor announced its partnership with Quantum Metric. The deal provided BetVictor with the ability to use users' collected data in order to evolve and develop consumer-centric products.

Sponsorship 

BetVictor has sponsored several events, tournaments, teams, and individuals.
Most notably the grade 1 listed Victor Chandler Chase at Ascot Racecourse. The company has also sponsored the Welsh Open snooker, the World Matchplay darts, and Fulham F.C.

Horse Racing

BetVictor has maintained close ties to the horseracing industry throughout its history and has invested significantly in the sport with several sponsorships and partnerships.

The Clarence House Chase, a Grade 1 National Hunt steeplechase in Great Britain, was sponsored by BetVictor (then Victor Chandler) from its inauguration in 1989 to 2013.
BetVictor went on to sponsor a second Grade 1 National Hunt steeplechase, the Queen Mother Champion Chase which is run at the Cheltenham Festival, in 2014.
Other notable sponsorships include the BetVictor Gold Cup at the Cheltenham November meeting from 2016-2019, the BetVictor Fighting Fifth Hurdle at Newcastle in 2018, and a multi-fixture partnership with Newbury Racecourse consisting of 41 individual races in 2021-2022 which include sponsorship of the Greatwood Gold Cup on behalf of Greatwood, a charity for the welfare of retired horses.

Football

BetVictor has sponsored multiple teams across various levels of English football.
Their first football sponsorship was Nottingham Forest. BetVictor (then Victor Chandler) was the club’s main sponsor from 2009-2012. 

BetVictor and Chelsea FC announced a new partnership for the 2015/16 season in which BetVictor became the club’s Official Betting and Gaming Partner. 

When that deal ended, BetVictor became a Principal Partner and the Official Training Kit Partner for Liverpool FC in a deal that lasted from 2016-2018. 

Darts

In 2013, BetVictor was unveiled as the title sponsor for the BetVictor World Matchplay darts tournament in a three-year deal, which they continued to extend until 2018. 

BetVictor was also the title sponsor for the BetVictor World Cup of Darts from 2019-2020. 

Snooker

BetVictor has had multiple involvements in the World Snooker Tour since 2016, sponsoring events including:
The BetVictor Home Nations Series consists of the BetVictor Northern Ireland Open from 2018-2022, the BetVictor English Open from 2018-2022, the BetVictor Scottish Open from 2018-2022, and the BetVictor Welsh Open, the fourth and final event of the Home Nations Series, from 2013-2016 and again from 2021-2022. 

The BetVictor European Series which includes the BetVictor Shoot Out from 2019-2022, the BetVictor German Masters in 2020, the BetVictor European Masters from 2020 to 2022, and the BetVictor Gibraltar Open from 2020-2022.

Brand Ambassadors

Ballon d’Or winner and former Liverpool, Real Madrid, Man Utd, and England International Michael Owen joined BetVictor as a brand ambassador in 2014 and has represented the brand across multiple mediums including TV, Social Media, and print until 2022.

Former football manager Harry Redknapp joined BetVictor as a brand ambassador in 2019 and frequently features in the bookmaker's TV adverts. 

2021 Grand National winner, 2021 Cheltenham Top Jockey and 2022 Cheltenham Gold Cup winner Rachael Blackmore was a BetVictor brand ambassador from 2019-21.

Cheltenham Festival-winning National Hunt trainer Jamie Snowden has been a BetVictor Brand Ambassador since 2019.

Also, former BetVictor brand ambassadors include 23-time Isle of Man TT winner John McGuinness and former snooker World Champion Judd Trump.

Regulation and Compliance

BetVictor holds active gambling licences in Great Britain, Gibraltar and the Republic of Ireland.

BetVictor is an active member of the Gibraltar Betting & Gaming Association (GBGA) Gibraltar Betting and Gaming Association - Wikipedia, a trade association representing online gaming operators in Gibraltar. BetVictor is also an active member of the Betting and Gaming Council (BGC) Home | Betting & Gaming Council (bettingandgamingcouncil.com), the standards body for the regulated UK betting and gaming industry.

In February 2022, BetVictor made a £1.7m payment in lieu of a financial penalty and £352,000 divestment of GGY, gained as a result of past failings directed towards the National Strategy to Reduce Gambling Harm. An £11,000 payment was also made to the Great British Gambling Commission towards costs associated with the investigation of the case. (BV Gaming Limited Public Statement - Gambling Commission)
References[edit]
0.	^ Jump up to:a b Genders, Roy (1990). NGRC book of Greyhound Racing. Pelham Books Ltd. ISBN 0-7207-1804-X.
1.	^ "Betting on Gibraltar". BBC News. 1999-05-14. Retrieved 2010-05-27.
2.	^ https://whalebets.com UK could become internet gambling leader|OUT-LAW.COM
3.	^ "VC Bet reverts back to Victor Chandler". Archived from the original on 2009-01-06. Retrieved 2009-01-22.
4.	^ "GBGA". Archived from the original on 9 September 2019. Retrieved 21 January 2014.
5.	^ Racing Post
6.	^ https://www.betvictor.com/
7.	^ "BetVictor Partners with Quantum Metric for the next step towards player-centricity". cision pr newswire. 15 September 2021. Retrieved 28 March 2022.
8.	^ "Fulham swaps betting operators in new shirt deal with BetVictor". 7 September 2020. Monday, 7 September 2020
9.	BV Gaming Limited Public Statement - Gambling Commission. 24 February 2022

References 

Bookmakers